Thomas Sullivan  (March 1, 1860 – April 12, 1947) was a Major League Baseball pitcher who played for the Columbus Buckeyes, Louisville Colonels and Kansas City Cowboys in the American Association from 1884 to 1889.

External links
Career statistics and bio at Baseball-Reference

1860 births
1947 deaths
Columbus Buckeyes players
Louisville Colonels players
Kansas City Cowboys players
19th-century baseball players
Atlanta Atlantas players
Charleston Seagulls players
Topeka Capitals players
Topeka Golden Giants players
Birmingham Barons players
Birmingham Maroons players
Baseball players from New York (state)